The Keppel Bay Bridge (Chinese: 吉宝湾桥) is the longest cable-stayed bridge in Singapore along Keppel Bay Vista, spanning 250 metres across the strait linking the private Keppel Island to mainland. The bridge was officially opened on 3 January 2008 by the sixth President of Singapore S. R. Nathan.

Built at a cost of $30 million, the cable-stayed bridge allows currents to flow freely through the marina basin, bringing in nutrients, plankton and marine larvae, while helping to remove sediment that would otherwise settle on marine organisms and smother them.

References

2008 establishments in Singapore
Bridges completed in 2008
Bridges in Singapore
Bukit Merah